Garry Butterworth (born 8 September 1969) was a professional footballer, having previously played for Dagenham & Redbridge, Rushden & Diamonds, Farnborough Town, and Kettering Town. He was a midfielder.

Career

Rushden & Diamonds
Butterwoth moved to Rushden & Diamonds in 1994 for £22,000, going on to play 368 times for the club, a club record. He also set a club record by playing in over 100 consecutive games. During his time at the club, Rushden progressed from the Southern Football League Premier Division to the Football League. His final game for the club was at Millennium Stadium in the Division Three play-offs.

His testimonial in 2001 was attended by over 4,000 fans.

Farnborough Town
Following his departure from Nene Park Butterworth joined Farnborough Town, who had just gained promotion to the Football Conference. He spent just a season there, playing 26 times, and scoring two goals. During his season at the club Farnborough enjoyed their best ever spells in the FA Cup (reaching the 4th round), and the quarter-finals of the FA Trophy.

Kettering Town
After leaving Farnborough, Butterworth joined Kettering Town.

Coates Athletic

Butterworth has since returned to the football field in his local town Whittlesey, playing regularly for Peterborough District Football League side, Coates Athletic during the seasons 2010/2011, 2011/2012 and 2012/2013.

Honours
Team Achievements
Southern League Midland Division Champions
Southern League Premier Division Champions
Football Conference Champions
Division Three Play-Off FinalistsIndividual Honours'''
Rushden & Diamonds
Supporters' Player of the Year: 1995
Supporters' Player of the Year: 1997
Players' Player of the Year: 1997

References

External links

SoccerFactsUK Profile for Kettering
SoccerFactsUK Profile for Stamford
Rushden & Diamonds profile
Career profile at UpThePosh

1969 births
Living people
People from Whittlesey
English Football League players
National League (English football) players
Peterborough United F.C. players
Kettering Town F.C. players
Dagenham & Redbridge F.C. players
Rushden & Diamonds F.C. players
Farnborough F.C. players
King's Lynn F.C. players
Stamford A.F.C. players
Wisbech Town F.C. players
Association football midfielders
English footballers
England semi-pro international footballers